Invasion of Your Privacy is the second studio album by American heavy metal band Ratt. It was released in 1985 and featured the singles "Lay It Down", "You're in Love" and "What You Give Is What You Get". Beau Hill produced the album, and the cover model is Playboy model Marianne Gravatte, who also made an appearance in the "Lay It Down" music video. In 2015, Loudwire ranked the album as the 8th best metal album of 1985.

Track listing

Personnel

Ratt
Stephen Pearcy – lead vocals
Robbin Crosby – lead guitar, backing vocals
Warren DeMartini – lead guitar, backing vocals
Juan Croucier – bass guitar, backing vocals
Bobby Blotzer – drums, percussion

Production
Beau Hill – producer, engineer
Jim Faraci, Stephen Benben – engineers
Ted Jensen – mastering at Sterling Sound, New York

Charts

Certifications

References 

1985 albums
Ratt albums
Atlantic Records albums
Albums produced by Beau Hill